Bideford Quay Station was a railway station in Bideford, north Devon; the southern terminus on the Bideford, Westward Ho! and Appledore Railway, serving the town and passengers from Bideford railway station on the London and South Western Railway. It lay on Bideford Quay where the company offices were situated.

History 
The station lay on Bideford Quay and had a siding and after considerable opposition from the town council a run round loop. Situated on a public road the rails were not set on standard railway sleepers, running instead on sunken longitudinal timbers.

Infrastructure
The station had freight facilities consisting of a single siding and a parcels service. A platform was not provided and the first section running towards the Pill Road was a tramway, however the run round loop allowed for locomotives to run round the coaches.

Micro history
In January 1901, the first train, with one carriage, ran from Bideford to Northam carrying a few friends of the Directors.

References 

Notes

Sources

 Baxter, Julia & Jonathan (1980). The Bideford, Westward Ho! and Appledore railway 1901-1917. Pub. Chard. .
 Christie, Peter (1995). North Devon History. The Lazarus Press. .
 Garner, Rod (2008). The Bideford, Westward Ho! & Appledore Railway. Pub. Kestrel Railway Books. .
 Griffith, Roger (1969). The Bideford, Westward Ho! and Appledore Railway. School project and personal communications. Bideford Museum.
 Jenkins, Stanley C. (1993). The Bideford, Westward Ho! and Appledore Railway. Oxford : Oakwood Press. .
 Stuckey, Douglas (1962). The Bideford, Westward Ho! and Appledore Railway 1901-1917. Pub. West Country Publications.

Disused railway stations in Devon
Former Bideford, Westward Ho! and Appledore Railway stations
Railway stations in Great Britain opened in 1901
Railway stations in Great Britain closed in 1917
Torridge District